Prospero Rabaglio (late 16th century) was an Italian painter. He was born in  Brescia. There is an altarpiece by him in the church of the Capuchins in that city, dated 1588.

References

16th-century Italian painters
Italian male painters
Painters from Brescia
Year of birth unknown
Year of death unknown